Hour of the Dawn is the third studio album by American indie rock band La Sera.

Reception

Hour of the Dawn received positive reviews from critics. On Metacritic, the album holds a score of 75/100 based on 14 reviews, indicating "generally favorable reviews."

Track listing
 Losing To The Dark
 Summer Of Love
 Running Wild
 Fall In Place
 All My Love Is For You
 Hour Of The Dawn
 Kiss This Town Away
 Control
 10 Headed Goat Wizard
 Storm's End

References

2014 albums
La Sera albums
Hardly Art albums